David (30 April 1819 – 24 September 1888) was a Georgian royal prince (batonishvili) of the Bagrationi dynasty. Son of Prince Bagrat of Georgia, grandson of King George XII of Georgia. He was known in Russia as the tsarevich David Bagratovich Gruzinsky. He was married to Anna Alekseyevna Mazurina with whom he had one son, Spiridon, who died in infancy. David died in Moscow.

Ancestry

References

1819 births
1888 deaths
Bagrationi dynasty of the Kingdom of Kartli-Kakheti
Georgian princes